The Lyon class was a set of battleships planned for the French Navy in 1913, with construction scheduled to begin in 1915. The class was to have comprised four ships, named Lyon, Lille, Duquesne, and Tourville. The first two were named for cities in France, and the latter pair honored the French admirals Abraham Duquesne and Anne Hilarion de Tourville. The Lyon class' design was an improvement on the previous , utilizing a fourth quadruple-gun turret to mount a total of sixteen  guns. Construction on the Lyons was cancelled due to the August 1914 outbreak of World War I, before any of the ships were laid down.

Design

Two years later, the French legislature passed a naval law which called for a fleet of twenty-eight battleships by 1920. Two more were projected for 1913 and another two for 1914, which were to be the first four s, though an amendment to the law increased the pace of construction to four Normandies in 1913 and a fifth of the same design in 1914. Four ships were projected for 1915. In 1913, the Navy authorized a fourth class of battleships, what was to have been the Lyon class, and scheduled their construction for 1915.

One of the main considerations for the new design was the armament to be carried. The French were aware that the latest British battleships—the —were to be armed with  guns, prompting significant consideration of matching this caliber for the Lyon design. The design staff prepared four variants, two armed with the standard French 34 cm gun in twin or quadruple gun turrets, and two armed with 38 cm guns in twin turrets. The designers also briefly considered a ship armed with twenty  guns in quadruple turrets, but the decrease in gun caliber was deemed to be a step in the wrong direction and it was quickly rejected. At the time, the French Navy believed that at the expected battle ranges in the Mediterranean, the 34 cm gun was effective and so the larger 38 cm gun was not necessary. The design staff determined the 38 cm gun would take too long to design, so the proposals that incorporated these weapons were rejected and officials chose between the two 34 cm proposals. On 24 November 1913, the design staff instead chose the slightly larger second design, armed with sixteen guns in four quadruple turrets, but the specific 34 cm gun to be used to arm the ships was still an open question.

The second proposal was for a 50-caliber gun that fired a larger  shell. The first option was ultimately selected in February 1914. The first two ships, Lyon and Lille, were scheduled to be ordered on 1 January 1915, and Duquesne and Tourville would have followed on 1 April.

The run-up to and beginning of World War I led to the end of the Lyon class. The French government mobilized its reserve forces in July, a month before the conflict, and thereby stripped its shipyards of many of the specialized tradesmen required for constructing the ships. The French also redirected their industrial capacity to weapons and munition orders from the army. In light of such constraints, the navy decided that only those ships that could be completed quickly would be worked upon, such as the Bretagnes.

Ships

Characteristics
The propulsion system had not been settled by the time the class was cancelled; the design staff proposed either the mixed steam turbine and triple-expansion engine system used in the first four ships of the preceding Normandie class or the all-turbine system used in the last Normandie-class ship, in a memo dated 13 September 1913. They also considered new geared turbines that had proved satisfactory in the new destroyer . An unknown number of boilers were to be trunked into two funnels amidships.

The main battery of the Lyons would have been sixteen 34 cm Modèle 1912M guns mounted in four quadruple-gun turrets. They would have all been mounted on the centerline, although the arrangement is not clear. A preliminary sketch, attached to the design staff's memo of 19 September 1913, showed one turret was placed forward, one amidships, and two in a superfiring pair aft, although the contemporary Journal of United States Artillery suggests the turrets would have been mounted in two superfiring pairs, forward and aft. Each pair of guns had its own ammunition hoist and magazine. They could be fired simultaneously or independently. Before work on the Lyon class had started, the French Navy had begun experimenting with new types of shells. After learning that shells had penetrated the hulls of battleships underwater to burst below their armored belts during the Battle of the Yellow Sea in 1904 and during British gunnery trials in 1907, the French Navy began investigating how they might optimize shell design to improve their performance through the water.

The secondary armament was to consist of twenty-four guns, either the 55-caliber 138.6 mm Modèle 1910 or a new automatic model, each singly-mounted in casemates in the hull sides. The ships would also have been equipped with a pair of  anti-aircraft guns and six submerged torpedo tubes of unknown size.

The ships would have been protected with a modified version of the armor layout of the earlier Normandie class. The reduction compensated for the additional armor below the waterline to better protect the hull against "diving" shells. The turrets were also intended to be protected with an armor thickness of 300 millimeters on their faces. The upper armored deck was intended to be .

Notes

Footnotes

Citations

References
 
 
 
 
 
 

Battleship classes
Proposed ships
Battleships of the French Navy
Ship classes of the French Navy